Frederick Richmond Goff (April 23, 1916 – September 26, 1982) was an American rare book librarian and specialist in incunabula.

Early life and education
Goff was born in Newport, Rhode Island, on April 23, 1916. He earned bachelor's and master's degrees from Brown University.

Professional life
Goff joined the Library of Congress in 1940, became Assistant Chief of the Rare Book Division in 1941, and Chief of the division in 1945. In 1961, he served as chair of the Rare Books and Manuscripts Section of the Association of College and Research Libraries, a division of the American Library Association, and from 1968 to 1970 as president of the Bibliographical Society of America. Goff retired in 1972.

Goff was a prolific author of scholarly works on incunabula, book history, and bibliography. His magnum opus is Incunabula in American Libraries: A Third Census of Fifteenth-century Books Recorded in North American Collections (New York: Bibliographical Society of America, 1964) which later formed the basis for the Incunabula Short Title Catalogue.

Death
Goff died of kidney failure and a heart ailment at a London hospital on September 26, 1982. He was in London attending a conference on incunabula. He is buried at Swan Point Cemetery.

References

1916 births
1982 deaths
American bibliographers
Brown University alumni
Incunabula
Librarians at the Library of Congress
Writers from Newport, Rhode Island
Deaths from kidney failure
Burials at Swan Point Cemetery
Rare book librarians
20th-century American non-fiction writers
Presidents of the Bibliographical Society of America